Ceromitia sciographa is a moth of the  family Adelidae or fairy longhorn moths. It was described by Edward Meyrick in 1922. It is found in Brazil.

References

Moths described in 1922
Adelidae
Endemic fauna of Brazil
Moths of South America